Sheron Mancilha Menezes (born 26 November 1983) is a Brazilian actress.

Career 

Menezzes starred in the TV Globo soap opera Esperança in April 2002 with the approval of the director Luiz Fernando Carvalho who was impressed with her test and suggested to the author, Benedito Ruy Barbosa, the changing age of the character, Julia, oldest first, so it could be played by newcomer Sheron Menezes. Sheron then won the role of the sweet and stately Julia, illegitimate daughter of Baron coffee, late husband of Frances iron hand, the character of Lúcia Veríssimo, who lived on the farm family as a maid. Julia ends up marrying a stranger, Hornet, played by Ali Jackson. Julia was well received by audiences and ended up yielding to Sheron three awards for his work and an invitation from director Luiz Antonio Pilar to act in the theater.

Between 2007 and 2008, Sheron lived in the novel Duas Caras, the fox Solange Couto Ferreira dos Santos Maciel, daughter of community leader Juvenal Antena (played by Antônio Fagundes). At first, father and daughter maintained a complicated relationship, due to the fact that Juvenal had discovered the existence of daughter only after 20 years. However, the initial differences gave way to joy and mutual affection between the two.

The actress lived the sweet and naive Milena, the telenovela Caras & Bocas (2009-2010), in the range of 19h.

In October 2010, was crowned Queen Sheron battery Portela. In November, announced the addition of a letter "z" in its name, going to sign Sheron Menezzes. In 2011, playing Sarita, will be on the soap opera Aquele Beijo, Miguel Falabella.

In 2012, interprets the envious Berenice in Lado a Lado, first villain of his career. Also in 2012, the actress starred in the movie O Inventor de Sonhos, the first film in the career of the actress.

Television

Film

References

External links 

1983 births
Living people
Actresses from Rio Grande do Sul
Afro-Brazilian actresses
Brazilian television actresses
Brazilian telenovela actresses
Brazilian film actresses
Brazilian stage actresses
People from Porto Alegre